The 1892 Connecticut gubernatorial election was held on November 8, 1892. It was a rematch of the 1890 Connecticut gubernatorial election. Democratic nominee Luzon B. Morris defeated Republican nominee Samuel E. Merwin with 50.31% of the vote.

Unlike the previous election, which resulted in a deadlock and neither candidate inaugurated as governor, Morris's win was not challenged this time, and he was inaugurated governor on January 4, 1893.

General election

Candidates
Major party candidates
Luzon B. Morris, Democratic
Samuel E. Merwin, Republican

Other candidates
E.P. Angin, Prohibition
E.M. Ripley, People's
Moritz E. Ruther, Socialist Labor

Results

References

1892
Connecticut
Gubernatorial